The 5th congressional district of Illinois covers parts of Cook and Lake counties, as of the 2023 redistricting which followed the 2010 census. All or parts of Chicago, Inverness, Arlington Heights, Barrington Hills, Des Plaines, Palatine, Mount Prospect, Deer Park, Kildeer, Lake Zurich, Long Grove, and North Barrington are included.

It has been represented by Democrat Mike Quigley since the April 2009 special election.

History

The district was created as part of the 28th United States Congress, which first met on March 4, 1843; it was initially represented by Stephen A. Douglas, whose Kansas–Nebraska Act prompted the creation of the Republican Party. Since the 1990s redistricting, it has covered most of Chicago's North Side; the 2010 redistricting extended it into DuPage County.
It was represented by Democrat Rahm Emanuel from January 2003 until he resigned on January 2, 2009, to become White House Chief of Staff. On April 8, 2009, Mike Quigley won a special election to fill the seat.

The district has a Cook Partisan Voting Index score of D +20. The district and its predecessors have been in Democratic hands for all but four years since 1909. Two of those years came after Dan Rostenkowski lost his seat to Republican Michael Patrick Flanagan because of the Congressional Post Office scandal. On a national level, the scandal helped prompt the Republican Revolution of 1994. However, Flanagan was defeated after only one term by State Representative Rod Blagojevich in 1996, and no Republican has managed even 35 percent of the vote in the district since then. Blagojevich handed the seat to Emanuel in 2003.

Composition as of 2023

Following the 2020 redistricting, this district will shift from a Chicago-based district to one primarily based in Cook County with a portion in southern Lake County.

The 5th district takes in the Chicago neighborhoods of Jefferson Park; the vast majority of O'Hare, Lincoln Park, Norwood Park, North Park, and Lake View; the historic North Mayfair neighborhood of Albany Park; most of Lincoln Square; and part of Irving Park.

Outside of the Chicago city limits, this district takes in the Cook County municipalities of Inverness; most of Arlington Heights and Barrington Hills; half of Des Plaines, Palatine, and Mount Prospect.

Lake County is split between this district and the 9th district. They are partitioned by the Fox River, Kelsey Rd, W Miller Rd, Echo Lake Rd, Sacomano Meadows Pond 1, Midlothian Rd, N Old Henry Rd, N Quentin Rd, Lake Zurich Rd, Twin Orchard Country Club, Mundelein Rd, Hicks Rd, Bridgewater Farm, Crossing Pond Park, and Arlington Heights Rd. The 5th district takes in the municipalities of Deer Park and Kildeer; the vast majority of Lake Zurich; the southern half of Long Grove; and the portion of North Barrington south of Miller Rd.

Recent statewide election results

Prominent representatives

List of members representing the district

Election results

2012

2014

2016

2018

2020

2022

See also

Illinois's congressional districts
List of United States congressional districts
United States congressional delegations from Illinois
Political history of Chicago

References

 Congressional Biographical Directory of the United States 1774–present

External links
District Fact Sheet from the U.S. Census Bureau

05
Congress-05
1843 establishments in Illinois
Constituencies established in 1843